Kim Sung-hee is a Korean name consisting of the family name Kim and the given name Sung-hee, and may also refer to:

 Kim Sung-hee (Miss Korea) (born 1959), South Korean singer and Miss Korea
 Kim Sung-hee (volleyball) (born 1976), South Korean female volleyball player
 Kim Sung-hee (singer, born 1989), South Korean female singer
 Ja Mezz (born Kim Sung-hee, 1989), South Korean male rapper

See also
Kim Song-hui (disambiguation) — McCune–Reischauer equivalent